Londis may refer to:

 Londis (United Kingdom), a chain of convenience store franchises operating in the United Kingdom
 Londis (Ireland), a chain of convenience store franchises operating in Ireland